The men's discus throw event at the 1987 Summer Universiade was held at the Stadion Maksimir in Zagreb on 17 July 1987.

Results

References

Athletics at the 1987 Summer Universiade
1987